St. Joseph's High School, Bhubaneswar is a Christian minority educational institution founded by Sisters of St Joseph of Annecy in 1951, in the Roman Catholic Archdiocese of Bhubaneswar. 

Students fm nursery onward are prepared for the class X-ICSE and ISC(+2).

St. Joseph's High School is Bhubaneswar's first convent English medium ICSE School, and remains "one of the most popular and reputed schools of the city with its students listed under the top 10 performers of the state almost every year."

References  

 
Catholic secondary schools in India
Primary schools in India
High schools and secondary schools in Odisha
Christian schools in Odisha
Schools in Bhubaneswar
Educational institutions established in 1951
1951 establishments in Orissa